is a Japanese football player. He is currently playing for Thespakusatsu Gunma.

Club statistics
Updated to 23 February 2017.

References

External links

Profile at Thespakusatsu Gunma

1987 births
Living people
Chuo University alumni
Association football people from Tokyo
Japanese footballers
J2 League players
Japan Football League players
Mito HollyHock players
Briobecca Urayasu players
Thespakusatsu Gunma players
Association football midfielders